The Government College of Engineering, Chandrapur (GCOEC) was established in 1996 in Chandrapur, Maharashtra, India. It is affiliated to Gondwana University. It is the only government institute under Gondwana University, Gadchiroli. It is completely funded by Government of Maharashtra. GCOEC is situated in the city of a super thermal power plant and at the center of the region with abundant coal. The region contributes in fulfilling the demand of energy resource as well as power of the country while, GCOEC promises to fulfill quality technical human resource needed for these sectors in India. The college is accredited by Directorate of Technical Education (DTE), Maharashtra and All India Council of Technical Education (AICTE).

Campus
The campus has a centralized library, a gymkhana.

Organisation and administration

Departments 
The college offers degrees in the following six disciplines of engineering:
 Instrumentation Engineering 
 Electrical Power Engineering 
 Mechanical Engineering 
 Computer Science Engineering
 Civil Engineering
 Electronics and Telecommunication Engineering
 Applied Mechanics Department
 Mathematics Department
 Physics Department
 Chemistry Department
 Humanities Department

PG Section
College started post graduation, i.e. Master's degree programs, from 2019 to 2020 in the following disciplines:
 Mechanical Eng.
 Electrical Power System

Academics

Admissions 
Admission criteria are based on the MHT-CET / JEE-Main rankings.

See also 
 Government Medical College, Chandrapur

References

External links

Engineering colleges in Maharashtra
Chandrapur
Educational institutions established in 1996
1996 establishments in Maharashtra